The Vezirishvili was a Georgian noble family, originally from Iran. Its founder accompanied Rostom Khan to Kartli and was confirmed in the princely rank in 1634. In the mid-18th century, the family converted to Georgian Orthodox Christianity. Their estates lay in the province of Shida Kartli. The Princes Vezirishvili were listed among the Georgian nobility in a special document attached to the Russo-Georgian Treaty of Georgievsk of 1783. After the Russian takeover of Georgia, the family was received into Russian nobility as Knyaz Vizirov (Князья Визировы) in 1828.

References 

Georgian-language surnames
Noble families of Georgia (country)
Russian noble families
Families of Iranian ancestry